"Sing About Me, I'm Dying of Thirst" is a song by American hip-hop artist Kendrick Lamar, from his major label debut studio album Good Kid, M.A.A.D City (2012). The song, which appears as the tenth track on the album, was released as a regular album track. It is one of Lamar's lengthier songs, clocking in at twelve minutes and three seconds. The song is split into two parts, the first part, titled "Sing About Me", which is about seven minutes, and the second part, titled "I'm Dying of Thirst", is approximately two minutes and fifty-seconds. There is a skit in between the two parts and another one after the second section. "Sing About Me" samples Grant Green's "Maybe Tomorrow" and the drum break from the track "Use Me" by Bill Withers, while "I'm Dying of Thirst" samples The Singers Unlimited cover of "My Romance".

The song garnered acclaim for Lamar's emotional lyricism and creative approach to self-critique as well as rapping verses from the perspectives of various characters that had appeared on his previous albums and songs on Good Kid, M.A.A.D City.

Critical reception 
"Sing About Me, I'm Dying of Thirst", in particular the first portion of the track, "Sing About Me", received widespread acclaim from critics and listeners since its release. It has been called by many as one of hip hop's great lyrical displays and storytelling tracks. Pitchfork described the song as a "stunning 12-minute denouement in which Lamar delivers a verse from a peripheral character that is the album's most dazzling stroke of empathy." In a review of Lamar's fourth studio album Damn, Teddy Craven of The Daily Campus compared "Sing About Me" to "Duckworth", saying both songs are "the high-points of their respective albums."

Remixes
The song was sampled by the American hip-hop recording artist Hodgy Beats' second mixtape Dena Tape 2 (2015) on the song "Moneyball". The song was also sampled by the American rapper XV, for his mixtape March Madness Vol. 2: Sweet Sixteen (2014) on the song "The Learning Tree".

Cover versions
The song's first part was covered by the American jazz pianist Armen Nalbandian, for his album Alis Grave Nil (2014) on the song "Sing About Me". The song's second part was covered by the American jazz pianist Robert Glasper for his album Covered (2015) on the song "I'm Dying of Thirst".

Media appearances
The song was featured in the American television series Grey's Anatomy at the end of the 2013 episode "Man on the Moon".

References

2012 songs
Kendrick Lamar songs
Songs written by Kendrick Lamar
Gangsta rap songs
Jazz rap songs
Music medleys